The following is a list of sport teams in the area of Tricity agglomeration, which includes the Polish cities of Gdańsk, Gdynia and Sopot.

Football

Men's

 Lechia Gdańsk — football team (Polish Cup winner 1983 & 2019, Polish Supercup winner 1983 & 2019; plays in the Ekstraklasa, formed in 1945)
 Arka Gdynia — football team (Polish Cup winner 1979 & 2017, Polish Supercup winner 2017 & 2018; plays in the I liga, formed in 1929)
 Bałtyk Gdynia — football team (formed in 1930)
 Gedania 1922 Gdańsk — football team (the reactivated club for Gedania Danzig, formed in 1945)
 SKS Stoczniowiec Gdańsk — football team (Polish Cup semi-finalists in 1975–76, formed in 1945)
 Portowiec Gdańsk — football team (formed in 1957)
 KP Jaguar Gdańsk — football team (formed in 2001)
 KP Sopot – amateur football team (1987–2017)

 Tricity Derby - rivalry between Arka and Lechia

Women's

 AP Orlen Gdańsk — women's football team (plays in the Ekstraliga, formed in 2014)
 Lechia Gdańsk Ladies — women's football team (formed in 2014)

Former teams

 BuEV Danzig — men's football team (played from 1903–1945)
 Gedania Danzig — men's football team (became Gedania 1922 Gdańsk in 1945, played from 1922–1939)
 Lechia-Polonia Gdańsk — men's football team (created by a merger between Lechia Gdańsk and SKS Stoczniowiec Gdańsk, then known as "Polonia Gdańsk", played from 1998–2002)
 Olimpia-Lechia Gdańsk — men's football team (created by a merger between Lechia Gdańsk and Olimpia Poznań, played from 1995–1996)
 Ostmark Danzig — men's football team (played from 1909–1945)
 Post SG Danzig — men's football team (team for the cities postal workers, played until 1945)
 Preußen Danzig — men's football team (played from 1909–1945)
 SG OrPo Danzig — men's football team (played from 1920–1945)

Rugby

Men's

 RC Lechia Gdańsk — Rugby union team (13x Polish Champions, 12x Polish Cup winners, formed in 1956)
 Ogniwo Sopot — Rugby union team (11x Polish Champions, 10x Polish Cup winners, formed in 1966)
 RC Arka Gdynia — Rugby union team (4x Polish Champions, 1x Polish Cup winners, formed in 1996)
 AZS-AWFiS Gdańsk — men's Rugby  union team (1x Polish Cup winners, played in the Ekstrliga from 1998—2005, formed in 1988)
 RC Lechia Gdańsk 7's — Rugby sevens team (8x Rugby 7's Polish Champions, formed in 1996)

Women's

 Biało-Zielone Ladies Gdańsk — Rugby sevens team (12x Rugby 7's Polish Champions, formed in 2009)

Former teams

 RC AZS Politechnika Gdańsk — men's Rugby team (Polish Championship runners-up in 1958, played from 1956–1961)

Handball

Men's

 Wybrzeże Gdańsk — men's handball team (10x Polish Superliga champions, formed in 1951)

Former teams

 AZS-AWFiS Gdańsk — men's handball team (played in the Superliga from 2003–06 & 2007–10, dissolved in 2010)
 GTPR Gdynia — women's handball team (2x Superliga champions, played from 1930–2018)
 Nata AZS-AWFiS Gdańsk — women's handball team (Superliga champions in 2004, dissolved in 2017)
 SMS ZPRP Gdańsk — men's handball team (played in the I liga, played from 1997–2021)
 Spójnia Gdynia — men's handball team (played in the Superliga from 2017–19, played from 2011–2019)

Basketball

Men's

 Arka Gdynia — basketball team (9x Basket Liga champions, 4x Polish Cup winners, 2x Polish SuperCup winners, formed in 1995)
 Trefl Sopot — basketball team (2x Polish Cup winners, 2x Polish SuperCup winners, formed in 2009)

Women's

 Arka Gdynia — basketball team (13x Basket Liga champions, formed in 1946)

Former teams

 Wybrzeże Gdańsk — men's basketball team (4x Basket Liga champions)
 Viking Gdynia — men's basketball team (played from 2000–2007)

Volleyball

Men's

 Trefl Gdańsk — volleyball team (2x Polish Cup winners, 1x Polish SuperCup winners, formed in 2005)

Women's

 Energa Gedania Gdańsk — volleyball team (3x Polish Champions, now focuses on its youth teams, formed in 1922)

Former teams

 Atom Trefl Sopot — women's volleyball team (2x Polish Champions, 1x Polish Cup winners, played from 2008—2017)

Ice Hockey

Former teams
 Stoczniowiec Gdańsk — men's ice hockey team (3x Polish Champions, played from 1953–2012, 2014–2021)
 Hockey Club Gdańsk — men's ice hockey team (played from 2012–2014)
 Pomeranian Hockey Club 2014 — men's ice hockey team (played in the Ekstraliga from 2016–2020, played from 2014–2020)

Speedway

 Wybrzeże Gdańsk — speedway team (formed in 1945)

American Football

 Seahawks Gdynia — men's American Football team (3x Polish Bowl winners, now based in Gdynia, formed in 2005)

Sailing

 Yacht Club of Poland — (formed in 1924)
 Gryf Marine Yacht Club — (formed in 1928)

References